Ramankulangara is a neighbourhood of Kollam city, India. It is 4 km away from Chinnakada and nearly 5 km from Kollam Junction Railway Station. Ramankulangara lies on the north side of the city. It is in Kavanad council of Kollam Municipal Corporation.

Places of interest
Most of the parts of Ramankulangara lies on the banks of Ashtamudi Lake. Vattakkayal, another freshwater lake in Kollam city, is located just 2 km to the west of Ramankulangara. BSF is planning to start a water training centre in Vattakkayal. The final decision is yet to come.  Ramankulangara is also an important trading centre of the Kollam corporation famous for fish and vegetables. Maruthadi just 2 km from Ramankulangara is an important fishing centre. Ramankulangara was chosen for the proposed Law College of Kollam and for the Kendriya Vidyalaya which is currently functioning at Mulamkadakam. The new campus for Kollam Kendriya Vidyalaya is at Ramankulangara now.

Politics
Ramankulangara is part of the Kollam Loksabha Constituency and part of the
Kollam Legislative Constituency.

See also
 Kollam
 Kollam Port
 Kollam district
 Kollam Junction
 Kollam KSRTC Bus Station
 Kollam Beach
 Paravur

References

External links
 Kollam Corporation Wards 

Neighbourhoods in Kollam